Relangi Venkata Ramayya ( 9 August 1910 – 27 November 1975), known mononymously by his surname as Relangi, was an Indian actor, comedian, and producer known for his works predominantly in Telugu cinema. He was honoured with the Padma Shri for his contribution to Indian cinema in 1970. Relangi is particularly known for his comic expressions, and dialogues during the 1950s and 1960s. Together with Ramana Reddy, they were a comedy double act.

Notable Relangi performances include films like Gunasundari Katha (1949), Vipra Narayana (1954), Missamma (1955), Donga Ramudu (1955), Mayabazar (1957), Appu Chesi Pappu Koodu (1958), Velugu Needalu (1961), Iddaru Mitrulu (1961), Kula Gothralu (1962), Lava Kusa (1963), Chaduvukunna Ammayilu (1963), Nartanasala (1963), and Preminchi Choodu (1965). The Relangi Art Academy Award was instituted in his honour for best comic performances.

Early life
Relangi was born in the village of Ravulapalem in the East Godavari district in Madras State (now Andhra Pradesh). He was a professional Harikatha performer and also an expert Harmonium player. He grew up in Kakinada; however, he didn't show interest in education due to his passion for acting.

Career
Relangi started his initial career acting in stage and folk theatre and also took female roles in stage theatre. He started his film career by playing a Vidushaka (Jester) role in his first Telugu film Sri Krishna Thulabaram in 1935 under the direction of C. Pullayya. Later on, he assisted Pullayya as a Production Manager until he got a major break with the film Gollabhama released in 1947. Subsequently, he played a comedic role in Vindhyarani (1948), which was a big hit. He was a regular face in all the movies made under the Vijaya Films banner from 1950. He grew so popular that he was given a chance to play a comedic hero role in Pakka inti Ammayi in 1953 under Pullayya opposite Anjali Devi.

Filmography

As a comedic actor, he was quite popular when partnered with actress Girija, actress Suryakantham, and another comedian actor, Ramana Reddy. These combinations were repeated for several hit movies in Telugu. Some of the well-known movies in which Relangi acted are shown below.

1930s
 Sri Krishna Thulabaram in 1935
 Vara Vikrayam in 1939

1940s

 Malathi Madhavam in 1940
 Bala Nagamma in 1942
 Gollabhama in 1947
 Vindhyarani in 1948
 Keelu Gurram in 1949
 Gunasundari Katha in 1949
 Mana Desam in 1949

1950s

 Samsaram in 1950
 Maaya Rambha in 1950
 Paramanandayya Shishyula Katha in 1950
 Shavukaru 
 Navvite Navaratnalu in 1951
 Patala Bhairavi in 1951
 Perantaalu in 1951
 Agni Pariksha in 1951
 Prema in 1952
 Dharma Devatha in 1952
 Daasi in 1952
 Manavati in 1952
 Priyuralu in 1952
 Tingu Ranga in 1952
 Peda Rythu in 1952
 Paradesi in 1953
 Velaikari Magal in 1953
 Pakka Inti Ammayi in 1953
 Chandirani in 1953
 Bratuku Theruvu in 1953
 Peddamanushulu in 1954
 Chandraharam in 1954
 Raju Peda in 1954
 Vipra Narayana in 1954
 Rani Ratnaprabha in 1955
 Jayasimha in 1955
 Missamma in 1955
 Ardhangi in 1955
 Rojulu Marayi in 1955
 Santhanam in 1955
 Donga Ramudu in 1955
 Jayam Manade in 1956
 Bhale Ramudu in 1956
 Chintamani in 1956
 Charana Daasi in 1956
 Veera Kankanam in 1957
 Todi Kodallu in 1957
 Sarangadhara in 1957
 Kutumba Gowravam in 1957
 Dongallo Dora in 1957
 Bhagya Rekha in 1957
 Allauddin Adhbhuta Deepam in 1957
 Maya Bazaar in 1957
 Suvarna Sundari in 1957
 Mangalya Balam in 1958
 Manchi Manasuku Manchi Rojulu in 1958
 Chenchu Lakshmi in 1958
 Appu Chesi Pappu Koodu in 1958

 Krishna Leelalu 1959
 Jayabheri in 1959
 Illarikam in 1959
"Nammina Bantu"in 1959

1960s

 Bhatti Vikramarka in 1960
 Shanthi Nivasam in 1960
 Samajam in 1960
 Pelli Kanuka in 1960
 Mamaku Tagga Alludu in 1960
 Vagdanam in 1960
 Usha Parinayam in 1961
 Sabhash Raja in 1961
 Velugu Needalu in 1961
 Iddaru Mitrulu in 1961
 Bharya Bharthalu in 1961
 Bhakta Jayadeva in 1961
 Jagadeka Veeruni Katha in 1961
 Kalasi Vunte Kaladu Sukham in 1961
 Khaidi Kannaiah in 1962
 Siri Sampadalu in 1962
 Raktha Sambandham in 1962
 Mohini Rugmangada in 1962
 Kula Gothralu in 1962
 Bhishma in 1962
 Aradhana in 1962
 Tiger Ramudu in 1962
 Mahamantri Timmarusu in 1962
 Chaduvukunna Ammayilu in 1963
 Lakshadhikari in 1963
 Lava Kusa in 1963
 Paruvu Prathishta in 1963
 Narthanasala in 1963
 Ramudu Bheemudu in 1964
 Pooja Phalam  in 1964
 Aathma Balam in 1964
 Sri Simhachala Kshetra Mahima in 1965
 Satya Harishchandra in 1965
 Preminchi Choodu in 1965
 Chitti Chellelu in 1965
 Antastulu in 1965
 Aatma Gowravam in 1965
 Navaratri in 1966
 Leta Manasulu in 1966
 Aastiparulu in 1966
 Srikakula Andhra Maha Vishnu Katha in 1966
 Pidugu Ramudu in 1966
 Ummadi Kutumbham in 1967
 Rahasyam in 1967
 Private Master in 1967
 Goodachari 116 in 1967
 Bhakta Prahlada in 1967
 Aada Paduchu in 1967
 Thalli Prema in 1968
 Bhale Tammudu in 1969
 Mathru Devata in 1969Karpura Harathi in 1969
 Asthulu Anthastulu in 1969

1970s

 Talli Tandrulu in 1970
 Jeevitha Chakram in 1971
 Ganga Manga in 1973
 Doctor Babu in 1973 as Jagannatha Rao
 Nippulanti Manishi in 1974
 Pooja in 1975

Singer
Some of the well-known songs sung by Relangi are in the following movies:

Producer
Relangi acted and produced the film Samajam'' in 1960.
Relangi owned a Theater in Tadepalligudem - Relangi Theater.

Awards
 In 1970, he was awarded the Padma Shri, a civilian award from the Government of India.
 In The 2019 movie N.T.R: Kathanayakudu, Brahmanandam portrayed him.

References

External links
 

1910 births
1975 deaths
Telugu film producers
Recipients of the Padma Shri in arts
Indian male comedians
Film producers from Andhra Pradesh
Telugu comedians
20th-century Indian male actors
People from East Godavari district
Telugu male actors
Male actors from Andhra Pradesh
Indian male film actors
20th-century Indian singers
Telugu playback singers
Singers from Andhra Pradesh
20th-century comedians